This is a list of the bird species recorded in Providencia. The avifauna of Providencia included a total of 157 species, according to Bird Checklists of the World as of July 2022.

This list is presented in the taxonomic sequence of the Check-list of North and Middle American Birds, 7th edition through the 63rd Supplement, published by the American Ornithological Society (AOS). Common and scientific names are also those of the Check-list, except that the common names of families are from the Clements taxonomy because the AOS list does not include them.

The following tags have been used to highlight several categories of occurrence.

 (A) Accidental - a species that rarely or accidentally occurs in Providencia

Ducks, geese, and waterfowl
Order: AnseriformesFamily: Anatidae

Anatidae includes the ducks and most duck-like waterfowl, such as geese and swans. These birds are adapted to an aquatic existence with webbed feet, flattened bills, and feathers that are excellent at shedding water due to an oily coating.

Blue-winged teal, Spatula discors 
Ring-necked duck, Aythya collaris (A)
Red-breasted merganser, Mergus serrator (A)
Ruddy duck, Oxyura jamaicensis (A)

Flamingos
Order: PhoenicopteriformesFamily: Phoenicopteridae

Flamingos filter-feed on shellfish and algae. Their oddly shaped beaks are specially adapted to separate mud and silt from the food they consume and, uniquely, are used upside-down.

American flamingo, Phoenicopterus ruber

Pigeons and doves
Order: ColumbiformesFamily: Columbidae

Pigeons and doves are stout-bodied birds with short necks and short slender bills with a fleshy cere.

White-crowned pigeon, Patagioenas leucocephala (A)
Common ground dove, Columbina passerina
Caribbean dove, Leptotila jamaicensis
White-winged dove, Zenaida asiatica

Cuckoos
Order: CuculiformesFamily: Cuculidae

The family Cuculidae includes cuckoos, roadrunners, and anis. These birds are of variable size with slender bodies, long tails, and strong legs. The Old World cuckoos are brood parasites.

Smooth-billed ani, Crotophaga ani (A)
Yellow-billed cuckoo, Coccyzus americanus (A)
Mangrove cuckoo, Coccyzus minor (A)
Black-billed cuckoo, Coccyzus erythropthalmus (A)

Nightjars and allies
Order: CaprimulgiformesFamily: Caprimulgidae

Nightjars are medium-sized nocturnal birds that usually nest on the ground. They have long wings, short legs and very short bills. Most have small feet, of little use for walking, and long pointed wings. Their soft plumage is camouflaged to resemble bark or leaves.

Common nighthawk, Chordeiles minor (A)
Chuck-will's-widow, Antrostomus carolinensis (A)

Swifts
Order: ApodiformesFamily: Apodidae

Swifts are small birds which spend the majority of their lives flying. These birds have very short legs and never settle voluntarily on the ground, perching instead only on vertical surfaces. Many swifts have long swept-back wings which resemble a crescent or boomerang.

Chimney swift, Chaetura pelagica (A)

Hummingbirds
Order: ApodiformesFamily: Trochilidae

Hummingbirds are small birds capable of hovering in mid-air due to the rapid flapping of their wings. They are the only birds that can fly backwards.

Green-breasted mango, Anthracothorax prevostii

Rails, gallinules, and coots
Order: GruiformesFamily: Rallidae

Rallidae is a large family of small to medium-sized birds which includes the rails, crakes, coots, and gallinules. Typically they inhabit dense vegetation in damp environments near lakes, swamps, or rivers. In general they are shy and secretive birds, making them difficult to observe. Most species have strong legs and long toes which are well adapted to soft uneven surfaces. They tend to have short, rounded wings and to be weak fliers.

Sora, Porzana carolina 
Common gallinule, Gallinula galeata 
American coot, Fulica americana 
Purple gallinule, Porphyrio martinica

Stilts and avocets
Order: CharadriiformesFamily: Recurvirostridae

Recurvirostridae is a family of large wading birds which includes the avocets and stilts. The avocets have long legs and long up-curved bills. The stilts have extremely long legs and long, thin, straight bills.

Black-necked stilt, Himantopus mexicanus 
American avocet, Recurvirostra americana (A)

Oystercatchers
Order: CharadriiformesFamily: Haematopodidae

The oystercatchers are large and noisy plover-like birds, with strong bills used for smashing or prising open molluscs.

American oystercatcher, Haematopus palliatus

Plovers and lapwings
Order: CharadriiformesFamily: Charadriidae

The family Charadriidae includes the plovers, dotterels, and lapwings. They are small to medium-sized birds with compact bodies, short thick necks, and long, usually pointed, wings. They are found in open country worldwide, mostly in habitats near water.

Black-bellied plover, Pluvialis squatarola
Wilson's plover, Charadrius wilsonia 
Semipalmated plover, Charadrius semipalmatus 
Killdeer, Charadrius vociferus

Sandpipers and allies
Order: CharadriiformesFamily: Scolopacidae

Scolopacidae is a large diverse family of small to medium-sized shorebirds including the sandpipers, curlews, godwits, shanks, tattlers, woodcocks, snipes, dowitchers, and phalaropes. The majority of these species eat small invertebrates picked out of the mud or soil. Variation in length of legs and bills enables multiple species to feed in the same habitat, particularly on the coast, without direct competition for food.

Whimbrel, Numenius phaeopus 
Ruddy turnstone, Arenaria interpres 
Red knot, Calidris canutus 
Sanderling, Calidris alba 
Baird's sandpiper, Calidris bairdii 
Least sandpiper, Calidris minutilla
White-rumped sandpiper, Calidris fuscicollis
Pectoral sandpiper, Calidris melanotos
Semipalmated sandpiper, Calidris pusilla
Western sandpiper, Calidris mauri
Short-billed dowitcher, Limnodromus griseus 
Wilson's snipe, Gallinago delicata 
Spotted sandpiper, Actitis macularia (A)
Solitary sandpiper, Tringa solitaria 
Greater yellowlegs, Tringa melanoleuca
Willet, Tringa semipalmata 
Lesser yellowlegs, Tringa flavipes

Skuas and jaegers
Order: CharadriiformesFamily: Stercorariidae

The family Stercorariidae are, in general, medium to large birds, typically with grey or brown plumage, often with white markings on the wings. They nest on the ground in temperate and arctic regions and are long-distance migrants.

Pomarine jaeger, Stercorarius pomarinus 
Parasitic jaeger, Stercorarius parasiticus (A)

Gulls, terns, and skimmers
Order: CharadriiformesFamily: Laridae

Laridae is a family of medium to large seabirds and includes gulls, kittiwakes, terns, and skimmers. They are typically grey or white, often with black markings on the head or wings. They have longish bills and webbed feet. Terns are a group of generally medium to large seabirds typically with grey or white plumage, often with black markings on the head. Most terns hunt fish by diving but some pick insects off the surface of fresh water. Terns are generally long-lived birds, with several species known to live in excess of 30 years.

Laughing gull, Leucophaeus atricilla
Franklin's gull, Leucophaeus pipixcan
Brown noddy, Anous stolidus
Least tern, Sternula antillarum
Gull-billed tern, Gelochelidon nilotica
Caspian tern, Hydroprogne caspia 
Black tern, Chlidonias niger 
Common tern, Sterna hirundo 
Forster's tern, Sterna forsteri (A)
Royal tern, Thalasseus maximus 
Sandwich tern, Thalasseus sandvicensis 
Elegant tern, Thalasseus elegans

Tropicbirds
Order: PhaethontiformesFamily: Phaethontidae

Tropicbirds are slender white birds of tropical oceans, with exceptionally long central tail feathers. Their heads and long wings have black markings.

Red-billed tropicbird, Phaethon aethereus

Shearwaters and petrels
Order: ProcellariiformesFamily: Procellariidae

The procellariids are the main group of medium-sized "true petrels", characterised by united nostrils with medium septum and a long outer functional primary.

Audubon's shearwater, Puffinus lherminieri

Frigatebirds
Order: SuliformesFamily: Fregatidae

Frigatebirds are large seabirds usually found over tropical oceans. They are large, black-and-white, or completely black, with long wings and deeply forked tails. The males have coloured inflatable throat pouches. They do not swim or walk and cannot take off from a flat surface. Having the largest wingspan-to-body-weight ratio of any bird, they are essentially aerial, able to stay aloft for more than a week.

Magnificent frigatebird, Fregata magnificens

Boobies and gannets
Order: SuliformesFamily: Sulidae

The sulids comprise the gannets and boobies. Both groups are medium to large coastal seabirds that plunge-dive for fish.

Masked booby, Sula dactylatra 
Brown booby, Sula leucogaster 
Red-footed booby, Sula sula (A)

Cormorants and shags
Order: SuliformesFamily: Phalacrocoracidae

Phalacrocoracidae is a family of medium to large coastal, fish-eating seabirds that includes cormorants and shags. Plumage colouration varies, with the majority having mainly dark plumage, some species being black-and-white, and a few being colourful.

Double-crested cormorant, Nannopterum auritum (A)

Pelicans
Order: PelecaniformesFamily: Pelecanidae

Pelicans are large water birds with a distinctive pouch under their beak. As with other members of the order Pelecaniformes, they have webbed feet with four toes.

American white pelican, Pelecanus erythrorhynchos (A)
Brown pelican, Pelecanus occidentalis (A)

Herons, egrets, and bitterns
Order: PelecaniformesFamily: Ardeidae

The family Ardeidae contains the bitterns, herons, and egrets. Herons and egrets are medium to large wading birds with long necks and legs. Bitterns tend to be shorter necked and more wary. Members of Ardeidae fly with their necks retracted, unlike other long-necked birds such as storks, ibises, and spoonbills.

Great blue heron, Ardea herodias 
Great egret, Ardea alba (A)
Snowy egret, Egretta thula 
Little blue heron, Egretta caerulea 
Tricolored heron, Egretta tricolor 
Cattle egret, Bubulcus ibis
Green heron, Butorides virescens 
Striated heron, Butorides striata (A)
Yellow-crowned night-heron, Nyctanassa violacea

Ibises and spoonbills
Order: PelecaniformesFamily: Threskiornithidae

Threskiornithidae is a family of large terrestrial and wading birds which includes the ibises and spoonbills. They have long, broad wings with 11 primary and about 20 secondary feathers. They are strong fliers and despite their size and weight, very capable soarers.

White ibis, Eudocimus albus
Glossy ibis, Plegadis falcinellus (A)

New World vultures
Order: CathartiformesFamily: Cathartidae

The New World vultures are not closely related to Old World vultures, but superficially resemble them because of convergent evolution. Like the Old World vultures, they are scavengers. However, unlike Old World vultures, which find carcasses by sight, New World vultures have a good sense of smell with which they locate carrion.

Turkey vulture, Cathartes aura

Osprey
Order: AccipitriformesFamily: Pandionidae

The family Pandionidae contains only one species, the osprey. The osprey is a medium-large raptor which is a specialist fish-eater with a worldwide distribution.

Osprey, Pandion haliaetus

Hawks, eagles, and kites
Order: AccipitriformesFamily: Accipitridae

Accipitridae is a family of birds of prey, which includes hawks, eagles, kites, harriers, and Old World vultures. These birds have powerful hooked beaks for tearing flesh from their prey, strong legs, powerful talons, and keen eyesight.

Mississippi kite, Ictinia mississippiensis
Swainson's hawk, Buteo swainsoni

Kingfishers
Order: CoraciiformesFamily: Alcedinidae

Kingfishers are medium-sized birds with large heads, long, pointed bills, short legs, and stubby tails.

Belted kingfisher, Megaceryle alcyon (A)

Woodpeckers
Order: PiciformesFamily: Picidae

Woodpeckers are small to medium-sized birds with chisel-like beaks, short legs, stiff tails, and long tongues used for capturing insects. Some species have feet with two toes pointing forward and two backward, while several species have only three toes. Many woodpeckers have the habit of tapping noisily on tree trunks with their beaks.

Yellow-bellied sapsucker, Sphyrapicus varius (A)

Falcons and caracaras
Order: FalconiformesFamily: Falconidae

Falconidae is a family of diurnal birds of prey. They differ from hawks, eagles, and kites in that they kill with their beaks instead of their talons.

Merlin, Falco columbarius (A)
Peregrine falcon, Falco peregrinus

New World and African parrots
Order: PsittaciformesFamily: Psittacidae

Parrots are small to large birds with a characteristic curved beak. Their upper mandibles have slight mobility in the joint with the skull and they have a generally erect stance. All parrots are zygodactyl, having the four toes on each foot placed two at the front and two to the back.

Brown-throated parakeet, Eupsittula pertinax

Typical antbirds
Order: PasseriformesFamily: Thamnophilidae

The antbirds are a large family of small passerine birds of subtropical and tropical Central and South America. They are forest birds which tend to feed on insects at or near the ground. A sizable minority of them specialize in following columns of army ants to eat small invertebrates that leave their hiding places to flee from the ants. Many species lack bright color with brown, black, and white being the dominant tones.

 Black-crowned antshrike, Thamnophilus atrinucha

Tyrant flycatchers
Order: PasseriformesFamily: Tyrannidae

Tyrant flycatchers are passerine birds which occur throughout North and South America. They superficially resemble the Old World flycatchers, but are more robust and have stronger bills. They do not have the sophisticated vocal capabilities of the songbirds. Most, but not all, have plain colouring. As the name implies, most are insectivorous.

Caribbean elaenia, Elaenia martinica (A)
Olive-sided flycatcher, Contopus cooperi
Western wood-pewee, Contopus sordidulus
Eastern wood-pewee, Contopus virens
Acadian flycatcher, Empidonax virescens
Sulphur-bellied flycatcher, Myiodynastes luteiventris
Piratic flycatcher, Legatus leucophaius
Tropical kingbird, Tyrannus melancholicus
Eastern kingbird, Tyrannus tyrannus
Gray kingbird, Tyrannus dominicensis

Vireos, shrike-babblers, and erpornis
Order: PasseriformesFamily: Vireonidae

The vireos are a group of small to medium-sized passerine birds. They are typically greenish in colour and resemble wood warblers apart from their heavier bills.

Mangrove vireo, Vireo pallens 
San Andres vireo, Vireo caribaeus 
Yellow-throated vireo, Vireo flavifrons
Philadelphia vireo, Vireo philadelphicus (A)
Red-eyed vireo, Vireo olivaceus
Yellow-green vireo, Vireo flavoviridis
Black-whiskered vireo, Vireo altiloquus (A)

Swallows
Order: PasseriformesFamily: Hirundinidae

The family Hirundinidae is adapted to aerial feeding. They have a slender streamlined body, long pointed wings, and a short bill with a wide gape. The feet are adapted to perching rather than walking, and the front toes are partially joined at the base.

Northern rough-winged swallow, Stelgidopteryx serripennis (A)
Purple martin, Progne subis
Brown-chested martin, Progne tapera (A)
Bank swallow, Riparia riparia
Barn swallow, Hirundo rustica
Cliff swallow, Petrochelidon pyrrhonota

Mockingbirds and thrashers
Order: PasseriformesFamily: Mimidae

The mimids are a family of passerine birds that includes thrashers, mockingbirds, tremblers, and the New World catbirds. These birds are notable for their vocalizations, especially their ability to mimic a wide variety of birds and other sounds heard outdoors. Their colouring tends towards dull-greys and browns.

Gray catbird, Dumetella carolinensis
Tropical mockingbird, Mimus gilvus

Thrushes and allies
Order: PasseriformesFamily: TurdidaeThe thrushes are a group of passerine birds that occur mainly in the Old World. They are plump, soft plumaged, small to medium-sized insectivores or sometimes omnivores, often feeding on the ground.

 Veery, Catharus fuscescens (A)
 Gray-cheeked thrush, Catharus minimus (A)
 Swainson's thrush, Catharus ustulatus

Wagtails and pipits
Order: PasseriformesFamily: Motacillidae

Motacillidae is a family of small passerine birds with medium to long tails. They include the wagtails, longclaws, and pipits. They are slender ground-feeding insectivores of open country.

 American pipit, Anthus rubescens (A)

Troupials and allies
Order: PasseriformesFamily: Icteridae

The icterids are a group of small to medium-sized, often colourful, passerine birds restricted to the New World and include the grackles, New World blackbirds, and New World orioles. Most species have black as the predominant plumage colour, often enlivened by yellow, orange, or red.

Orchard oriole, Icterus spurius 
Jamaican oriole, Icterus leucopteryx 
Great-tailed grackle, Quiscalus mexicanus

New World warblers
Order: PasseriformesFamily: Parulidae

The New World warblers are a group of small, often colourful, passerine birds restricted to the New World. Most are arboreal, but some are terrestrial. Most members of this family are insectivores.

Ovenbird, Seiurus aurocapilla (A)
Worm-eating warbler, Helmitheros vermivorum (A)
Louisiana waterthrush, Parkesia motacilla 
Northern waterthrush, Parkesia noveboracensis 
Black-and-white warbler, Mniotilta varia 
Prothonotary warbler, Protonotaria citrea (A)
Swainson's warbler, Limnothlypis swainsonii (A)
Tennessee warbler, Leiothlypis peregrina (A)
Connecticut warbler, Oporornis agilis (A)
Kentucky warbler, Geothlypis formosa (A)
Common yellowthroat, Geothlypis trichas (A)
Hooded warbler, Setophaga citrina (A)
American redstart, Setophaga ruticilla (A)
Cape May warbler, Setophaga tigrina (A)
Northern parula, Setophaga americana 
Magnolia warbler, Setophaga magnolia (A)
Bay-breasted warbler, Setophaga castanea
Blackburnian warbler, Setophaga fusca 
Yellow warbler, Setophaga petechia (A)
Chestnut-sided warbler, Setophaga pensylvanica 
Blackpoll warbler, Setophaga striata (A)
Black-throated blue warbler, Setophaga caerulescens (A)
Palm warbler, Setophaga palmarum (A)
Yellow-rumped warbler, Setophaga coronata (A)
Yellow-throated warbler, Setophaga dominica (A)
Prairie warbler, Setophaga discolor (A)
Black-throated green warbler, Setophaga virens 
Canada warbler, Cardellina canadensis

Cardinals and allies
Order: PasseriformesFamily: Cardinalidae

The cardinals are a family of robust, seed-eating birds with strong bills. They are typically associated with open woodland. The sexes usually have distinct plumages.

Summer tanager, Piranga rubra
Scarlet tanager, Piranga olivacea 
Rose-breasted grosbeak, Pheucticus ludovicianus 
Blue grosbeak, Passerina caerulea (A)
Indigo bunting, Passerina cyanea (A)
Dickcissel, Spiza americana (A)

Tanagers and allies
Order: PasserriformesFamily: Thraupidae

The tanagers are a large group of small to medium-sized passerine birds restricted to the New World, mainly in the tropics. Many species are brightly coloured. As a family they are omnivorous, but individual species specialize in eating fruits, seeds, insects, or other types of food.

Bananaquit, Coereba flaveola
Black-faced grassquit, Melanospiza bicolor

See also

List of birds
Lists of birds by region

References

 
Providencia